Mary Etherington was an English horse breeder from Withypool credited with reviving the Exmoor pony population after World War II. She and her husband, James Grant Speed (1906-1980) co-founded the Exmoor Pony Trekking Society at the Royal (Dick) School of Veterinary Studies now part of the University of Edinburgh.

Etherington was responsible for the breeding of Herd 2 Exmoors after they were left to her by her mother. Originally Herd 2 was bred by Mr F.G. Heal. He then left the ponies to Etherington's mother, who was the wife of the rector at Withypool. In 1943 the ponies were split between her two daughters, Mary and Joy, with Mary taking Herd 2 and Joy taking Herd 3.

Immediately following World War II, the Exmoor pony population had dwindled to under fifty as hundreds of ponies had been shot by soldiers during the war and others had been stolen from fields and killed for food. Mary Etherington rallied breeders together to restore cattle grids and secure boundaries to the Commons in order to re-establish their herds, proclaiming in 1947, "The coming generations will have good reason to call us unfaithful stewards if when we are gone there are no little horses on the Exmoor hills." In 1948, she also exhibited two Exmoor ponies at the London Zoo in order to raise awareness of the threats they faced.

Etherington was consulted in government discussions on increasing the sheep and cattle population in Exmoor in 1949. That year, she left home and moved the herd around England searching for a permanent home for the ponies. She loaned a number of ponies to Maryon Wilson Park in Greenwich in 1950 which initiated its development into an animal park.

In 1952, Etherington heard from a friend at the British Museum about a research project on native pony breeds at the University of Edinburgh led by James Grant Speed, a Professor of Anatomy at the Royal (Dick) School of Veterinary Studies. Etherington took her herd of twenty ponies on the train to Edinburgh and donated them to the veterinary school for conservation and research. She and Speed were married soon after.

The ponies were used to set up the Exmoor Pony Trekking Society after the success of pony trekking in Newtonmore. The club intended that by taking the public out for treks, the breed would be publicized as useful horses and pay for their own keep. Mary Stone ran treks each summer from the Snoot Youth Hostel in Hawick. The treks continued from a number of locations around Edinburgh and now run from the Pentland Hills.

When Mary and her husband decided to sell the Herd 2 Exmoor ponies, the students who had been running the treks formed a syndicate and in 1962 bought a core group of mares. These were bred as herd two until the last foal in 2009.

Document collections

References 

Conservationists
Women conservationists
Year of birth missing
Year of death missing
People from Somerset
Horse breeders